Mervyn Malcolm Dymally (May 12, 1926 – October 7, 2012) was an American politician from California. He served in the California State Assembly (1963–1966) and the California State Senate (1967–1975) as the 41st Lieutenant Governor of California (1975–1979) and in the U.S. House of Representatives (1981–1993). Dymally returned to politics a decade later to serve in the California State Assembly (2003–2008).

Dymally was the first Trinidadian to serve California as State Senator and Lieutenant Governor. He was one of the first persons of Dougla (mixed African and Indian) origin to serve in the U.S. Congress.

In 1974, he and George L. Brown became among the first African Americans elected to statewide state office since Oscar Dunn did so during Reconstruction.

Edward W. Brooke, III (R-MA) had been elected Attorney General of Massachusetts in 1962 and 1964, and was elected to the United States Senate from Massachusetts in 1966 and 1972. Dymally was the second African-American to hold statewide office in California, following Wilson Riles who served as California Superintendent of Public Instruction starting in 1971.

Early life and education
Born in Cedros, Trinidad and Tobago, Dymally first received his secondary education at Naparima College before transferring to Saint Benedict's College, both in San Fernando. He is of Dougla (mixed African and Indian) descent.

He moved to the United States to study journalism at Lincoln University in Jefferson City, Missouri. After a semester there, he moved to the greater Los Angeles area to attend Chapman University, and completed a Bachelor of Arts in education at California State University, Los Angeles in 1954. Dymally became a member of Kappa Alpha Psi fraternity in 1949. Dymally became a U.S. citizen in 1957.

In 1969, while serving in the California State Legislature, he earned a master's degree in government from California State University, Sacramento. Dymally earned his doctorate in human behavior from United States International University in San Diego (now Alliant International University).

Career
In the tightly contested race for Lt. Governor in 1978, Dymally's bid for re-election was derailed when Michael Franchetti, an aide to State Senator George Deukmejian, floated a false rumor that Dymally was about to be indicted. The story, coming days before the election, harmed the Dymally campaign, and Dymally lost to Republican Mike Curb.

Franchetti later said that the source of the rumor was a Los Angeles Times reporter, who called the Justice Department trying to confirm its authenticity. Franchetti could not substantiate the rumor but included it in a report. The report was passed to Curb's office with the rumor part erased, after which it moved to broadcaster Bill Stout who announced it as fact on Los Angeles radio station KNX (AM) and its CBS affiliates. (Stout's wife worked for Curb.) Then-Attorney General Younger filed a letter of reprimand in Franchetti's personnel records, accusing him of a breach of responsibility.

Dymally was an old friend of Peoples Temple founder Jim Jones. When Jones decided to move his congregation to Jonestown, Guyana, Dymally "wrote the Guyanese prime minister to reassure him that Jones was an upstanding citizen." The Jonestown compound would be the site of the mass suicide of over 900 people on November 18, 1978.

In 1983 he joined with 7 other Congressional Representatives to sponsor a resolution to impeach Ronald Reagan over his sudden and unexpected invasion of Grenada.

In the 1990s, Dymally served as a paid lobbyist for the country of Mauritania, attempting to present the country as engaged in abolishing every remnant of slavery.

Dymally came out of retirement and returned to the California State Assembly in 2002 when Assemblyman Carl Washington was term limited. He served for six years and then tried to return to the State Senate in 2008. However, he was defeated in the Democratic primary for State Senate election by Rod Wright. He died in Los Angeles and is buried at Holy Cross Cemetery in Culver City.

Mervyn M Dymally Senior High School at 88th street and San Pedro in South Central Los Angeles, part of the Los Angeles Unified School District is named in his honor.

See also
 List of African-American United States representatives
 List of Asian Americans and Pacific Islands Americans in the United States Congress
 List of minority governors and lieutenant governors in the United States

References

External links

record from the Washington Post
 
 Join California Mervyn M. Dymally
 

|-

|-

|-

|-

|-

1926 births
2012 deaths
20th-century American politicians
21st-century American politicians
African-American members of the United States House of Representatives
Asian-American members of the United States House of Representatives
African-American state legislators in California
California politicians of Indian descent
American politicians of Indian descent
American memoirists
Democratic Party California state senators
California State University, Sacramento alumni
Trinidad and Tobago people of Indian descent
Lieutenant Governors of California
Lincoln University (Missouri) alumni
Democratic Party members of the California State Assembly
Members of the United States Congress of Indian descent
Democratic Party members of the United States House of Representatives from California
People from Siparia region
Trinidad and Tobago emigrants to the United States
United States International University alumni
20th-century African-American politicians
African-American men in politics
21st-century African-American politicians
People from Compton, California
Burials at Holy Cross Cemetery, Culver City